The Ford TeamRS was Ford Motor Company's European performance car and motorsport division for Ford Racing activity. The Ford RS badge was born for rally racing, the RS stands for Rallye Sport. TeamRS was the successor to Ford Special Vehicle Engineering.

TeamRS has been superseded by a global organisation called Ford Performance. They are responsible for the conversion of the 2006 Ford GT from US-Spec to Euro-Spec.

History

Ford RS models 
 1969 - Ford 17m RS, Ford 20m RS, Ford 15m RS
 1970 - Ford Escort RS1600, Ford Capri RS2600
 1973 - Ford Escort RS2000, Ford Capri RS3100
 1975 - Ford Escort RS1800
 1976 - Ford Escort RS Mexico, Ford Escort RS2000 Mk II
 1981 - Ford Escort RS1600i
 1984 - Ford Escort RS Turbo, Ford RS200
 1985 - Ford Sierra RS Cosworth
 1987 - Ford Sierra RS500 Cosworth
 1988 - Ford Sierra Cosworth
 1990 - Ford Sierra Cosworth 4x4. Ford Fiesta RS Turbo
 1991 - Ford Escort RS2000
 1992 - Ford Escort RS Cosworth, Ford Fiesta RS1800
 1994 - Ford Escort RS2000 4x4
 2002 - Ford Focus RS
 2003 - Ford Tierra RS/Ford Laser Lynx RS
 2009 - Ford Focus RS Mk II
 2010 - Ford Focus RS500
 2015 - Ford Focus RS Mk III

Ford ST models
 1997 - Ford Mondeo ST24
 2000 - Ford Mondeo ST200
 2002 - Ford Focus ST170, Ford Mondeo ST220
 2004 - Ford Fiesta ST
 2005 - Ford Focus ST
 2012 - Ford Focus ST
 2018 - Ford Focus ST
 2013 - Ford Fiesta ST
 2017 - Ford Fiesta ST
 2019 - Ford Edge ST
 2020 - Ford Explorer ST

See also      
Ford Racing
Ford Performance Vehicles Special Vehicle Team (SVT), North America's performance car division
Ford Performance Vehicles (FPV), Australia's performance car division
Ford Special Vehicle Operations (SVO)
Ford World Rally Team
The Professionals (TV series)

References

External links
 Official Ford Focus RS on Facebook
 Focus RS Owners Club (FocusRSoc.com)
 First Ford RS Owners Club (rsownersclub.co.uk)

Media links

 
Official motorsports and performance division of automakers